Narayan Prasad Marasini (born 18  December 1967) is a Nepali communist politician and a member of the House of Representatives of the federal parliament of Nepal. He was elected from Syangja-1 constituency defeating Raju Thapa of Nepali Congress by more than 10,000 votes. A long time member of CPN UML, he represents the newly formed Nepal Communist Party (NCP) following the merger of the party with CPN (Maoist Centre). He was also the candidate for CPN UML in Syangja-1 constituency in the second constituent assembly election, in 2013.

References

Living people
1967 births
Place of birth missing (living people)
21st-century Nepalese people 
People from Syangja District
Communist Party of Nepal (Unified Marxist–Leninist) politicians
Nepal Communist Party (NCP) politicians
Nepal MPs 2017–2022